Schruns is a municipality in the Montafon valley (altitude 690 meters), in the Bludenz district of the westernmost Austrian state of Vorarlberg.

To the west is the famous Zimba mountain, often called the "Vorarlberger Matterhorn," which is very popular among climbers and hikers.

Geography 
The Litz river, a tributary of the Ill river flows through the town.  A side valley, the Silbertal, stretches to the east of Schruns. The area has a high mountain massif accessible by train and ski-lifts.

To the north is the Bartholomäberg, to the south St. Gallenkirch, and to the west Tschagguns. The nearest larger municipality is Bludenz.

About 45.2 percent of the area is forested, with 18.1 percent mountainous.

Sports 
Since 2012/13, Schruns has been part of the FIS Snowboard World Cup, which takes place annually in December. During the daytime, visitors can watch snowboard cross races up on the Hochjoch of the Silvretta Montafon ski area. In the evening, concerts are held in Schruns.

Schruns is a hotspot for mountain biking and trail running. For more than ten years, Schruns has hosted the M3 Montafon Bike Marathon with over 500 bikers.

Notable people

In the early 1920s Schruns was the favorite ski resort of Ernest Hemingway.  He wintered there with his first wife, Hadley, and oldest son, who was then just an infant. It was there that he revised the manuscript of The Sun Also Rises.  In Hemingway's classic story "The Snows of Kilimanjaro" the third scene in the first flashback sequence recounts memories of Schruns.  These images of snow and glacier skiing stand in stark contrast to the description of the Serengeti Plain in the main story and anticipate the coming journey to the snows of Kilimanjaro.

Richard von Coudenhove-Kalergi died there in 1972
Elisabeth Schwarzkopf lived in the village in her last years and died there in 2006
Georg Margreitter, footballer for Grasshopper Club Zürich, born in 1988

References

External links
topskiresort.com - Schruns ski resort guide, ratings, webcams, news...

Cities and towns in Bludenz District